The Hill of Phinehas is a location described in the Bible :33 as being the burial place of Eleazar and Ithamar. 

It is associated with the location of the village of Awarta in the West Bank. In the early 18th century, the site was purchased by a Samaritan, Abraham Danafi, to be used by the community.

Large tombs in the town have been attributed to the burial sites of Aaron's sons Ithamar and Eleazar. His grandson Phinehas is believed to be buried at the site alongside his son Abishua — the latter is especially revered by the Samaritans, who believe that he wrote the Torah. The seventy Elders are believed to be buried in a cave near Phinehas' tomb. On the western side of Awarta lies the tomb Muslims attribute to Nabi Uzeir, Ezra the scribe.

References

Bibliography
  
 https://archive.org/stream/adescriptivegeo00schwgoog#page/n186/mode/2up

Nablus Governorate
Jewish pilgrimage sites